M.B. Convent High School & Jr. College (Dosar Vaish Education Society), is a high school and junior college in Nagpur, India.

M.B. Convent High School & Jr. College, situated at Dosar Bhavan, Central Avenue. The Institution is run by Shree Dosar Vaish Shaikshanik Mandal. M.B. Convent High School & Jr. College provides qualitative teaching from Nursery to XII Arts, Science & Commerce. The school follows the standard with the state board pattern.

Shree Dosar Vaish Shaikshanik Mandal
Shree Dosar Vaish Shaikshanik Mandal, founded in 1978 is a committee of dedicated and educated members working in field of education. The primary objective of the committee is to provide quality education with a moderate fee structure. The main motto is to impart education to all the sections of the society.

Management Committee

See also
List of educational institutions in Nagpur

References

External links

High schools and secondary schools in Maharashtra
Junior colleges in Maharashtra
Schools in Nagpur